I Am Cuba (Ya - Kuba) is a 1964 anthology drama film directed by Mikhail Kalatozov at Mosfilm. An international co-production between the Soviet Union and Cuba, it was not received well by either the Russian or Cuban public and was almost completely forgotten until it was re-discovered by filmmakers in the United States thirty years later. The acrobatic tracking shots and idiosyncratic mise en scene prompted Hollywood directors like Martin Scorsese to begin a campaign to restore the film in the early 1990s.

The film is shot in black and white, sometimes using infrared film obtained from the Soviet military to exaggerate contrast (making trees and sugar cane almost white, and skies very dark but still obviously sunny). Most shots are in extreme wide-angle and the camera passes very close to its subjects, whilst still largely avoiding having those subjects ever look directly at the camera.

Plot 
The movie consists of four distinct short stories about the suffering of the Cuban people and their reactions, varying from passive amazement in the first, to a guerrilla march in the last. Between the stories, a female narrator (credited "The Voice of Cuba") says such things as, "I am Cuba, the Cuba of the casinos, but also of the people."

The first story (centered on the character Maria) shows the destitute Cuban masses contrasted with the splendor in the American-run gambling casinos. Maria lives in a shanty-town on the edge of Havana and hopes to marry her fruit-seller boyfriend, Rene. Rene is unaware that she leads an unhappy double-life as "Betty", a bar prostitute at one of the Havana casinos catering to rich Americans. One night, her client asks her if he can see where she lives rather than take her to his own room. She takes him to her small hovel where she reluctantly undresses in front of him. The next morning he tosses her a few dollars and takes her most prized possession, her crucifix necklace. As he is about to leave Rene walks in and sees his ashamed fiancée. The American callously says, "Goodbye Betty!" as he makes his exit. He is disoriented by the squalor he encounters as he tries to find his way out of the area.

The next story is about a farmer, Pedro, who just raised his biggest crop of sugar yet. However, his landlord rides up to the farm as he is harvesting his crops and tells him that he has sold the land that Pedro lives on to United Fruit, and Pedro and his family must leave immediately. Pedro asks what about the crops? The landowner says, "you raised them on my land. I'll let you keep the sweat you put into growing them, but that is all," and he rides off. Pedro lies to his children and tells them everything is fine. He gives them all the money he has and tells them to have a fun day in town. After they leave, he sets all of his crops and house on fire. He then dies from the smoke inhalation.

The third story describes the suppression of rebellious students led by a character named Enrique at Havana University (featuring one of the longest camera shots). Enrique is frustrated with the small efforts of the group and wants to do something drastic. He goes off on his own planning on assassinating the chief of police, however when he gets him in his sights, he sees that the police chief is surrounded by his young children, and Enrique cannot bring himself to pull the trigger. While he is away, his fellow revolutionaries are printing flyers. They are infiltrated by police officers who arrest them. One of the revolutionaries begins throwing flyers out to the crowd below only to be shot by one of the police officers. Later on, Enrique is leading a protest at the university. More police are there to break up the crowd with fire hoses. Enrique is shot after the demonstration becomes a riot. At the end, his body is carried through the streets; he has become a martyr to his cause.

The final part shows Mariano, a typical farmer, who rejects the requests of a revolutionary soldier to join the ongoing war. The soldier appeals to Mariano's desire for a better life for his children, but Mariano only wants to live in peace and insists the soldier leave. Immediately thereafter though, the government's planes begin bombing the area indiscriminately. Mariano's home is destroyed and his son is killed. He then joins the rebels in the Sierra Maestra Mountains, ultimately leading to a triumphal march into Havana to proclaim the revolution.

Cast 
 Sergio Corrieri as Alberto
 Salvador Wood
 José Gallardo as Pedro
 Raúl García as Enrique
 Luz María Collazo as Maria / Betty
 Jean Bouise as Jim (in Cuban version) (as Jean Bouisse)
 Alberto Morgan as Ángel
 Celia Rodriguez as Gloria (in Cuban version) (as Zilia Rodríguez)
 Fausto Mirabal

Production 

Shortly after the 1959 Cuban Revolution overthrew the United States-backed dictatorship of Fulgencio Batista, the socialist Castro government, isolated by the United States after the latter broke diplomatic and trade relations in 1961, turned to the USSR in many areas, including for film partnerships. The Soviet government, interested in promoting international socialism, and perhaps in need to further familiarize itself with its new ally, agreed to collaborate with the Instituto Cubano del Arte e Industria Cinematográficos (ICAIC), and finance a film about the Cuban revolution.

The director was given considerable freedom to complete the work, and was given much help from both the Soviet and Cuban governments. The film made use of many innovative techniques, such as coating a watertight camera's lens with a special submarine periscope cleaner, so the camera could be submerged and lifted out of the water without any drops on the lens or film. At one point, more than 1,000 Cuban soldiers were moved to a remote location to shoot one scene—this despite the then-ongoing Cuban Missile Crisis.

In another scene, the camera follows a flag over a body, held high on a stretcher, along a crowded street. Then it stops and slowly moves upwards for at least four storeys until it is filming the flagged body from above a building. Without stopping, it then starts tracking sideways and enters through a window into a cigar factory, then goes straight towards a rear window where the cigar workers are watching the procession. The camera finally passes through the window and appears to float along over the middle of the street between the buildings. These shots were accomplished by the camera operator having the camera attached to his vest—like an early, crude version of a Steadicam—while also wearing a vest with hooks on the back.  An assembly line of technicians would hook and unhook the operator's vest to various pulleys and cables that spanned floors and building roof tops.

Reception 

Despite its dazzling technical and formal achievements receiving excellent support, and the participation of the renowned team of Soviet cinematographers Mikhail Kalatozov and Sergei Urusevsky (winners of the 1958 Cannes Film Festival Palme d'Or for The Cranes are Flying, another virtuosistic art film, and also in the midst of the Cold War), the movie was given a rather cold reaction by audiences. In Havana it was criticized for showing a stereotypical view of Cubans, and in Moscow it was considered naïve, not sufficiently revolutionary, even too sympathetic to the lives of the bourgeois, pre-Castro classes.

Cameraman Alexander Calzatti stated that the crew "was so enthusiastic [that] we were infected by it, and we worked very hard"; as a result "very soon after we came back to Russia, more than half of our crew died. I survived because I was very young."

Also, upon its original release, the movie never reached Western countries largely because it was a communist production, in the midst of the Cold War era, and due to the United States embargo against Cuba.

Restoration 

Until the USSR collapsed in the early 1990s, I Am Cuba was virtually unknown. In 1992, a print of the film was screened at the Telluride Film Festival. The San Francisco International Film Festival screened the film in 1993. Shortly after the festival, three film professionals who had screened I Am Cuba at the San Francisco screening contacted friends at Milestone Films, a small New York film distributor specializing in the release of once-lost and neglected older films. Milestone screened a slightly blurry, unsubtitled VHS tape of the film and then went about acquiring the distribution rights from Mosfilm in Russia. Milestone's release opened at New York's Film Forum in March 1995. For the tenth anniversary of the film release, Milestone debuted a new 35 mm restoration of I Am Cuba without the Russian overdubbing in September 2005. Milestone released an Ultimate Edition DVD boxset at the time as well, with a video appreciation from Scorsese.

On March 19, 2018 the trailer for a new 4K restoration by Milestone films was released. It became available later that year on Milestone films' Vimeo powered streaming service. Sometime after April 2021 this film was removed from the Milestone films streaming catalog because they sold the film's license to another company. Until that company announces their re-release of the restored version of the film, which may happen in the beginning of 2022, Milestone films is not at liberty to say who bought the license. Milestone films' customers that purchased home use 4K streaming rights to the film were offered an HD digital download of the film and if those customers asked for a 4K download they were given a refund on their purchase. This 4K restoration has therefore never been made available in 4K.

Documentary 
In 2005, a documentary about the making of I Am Cuba was released called Soy Cuba: O Mamute Siberiano or I Am Cuba: the Siberian Mammoth, directed by the Brazilian Vicente Ferraz. The documentary looks at the history of the making of the film, explains some of the technical feats of the film, and features interviews with many of the people who worked on it.

See also 
 Cinema of Cuba
 List of Cuban films

References

External links 
 
 
 
 
 From Russia with Love, an article by Richard Gott from The Guardian November 2005
  "The 34 best political movies ever made", Ann Hornaday, The Washington Post Jan. 23, 2020), ranked #28

1964 films
1964 in the Soviet Union
1960s avant-garde and experimental films
Cuba–Soviet Union relations
Cuban avant-garde and experimental films
Films directed by Mikhail Kalatozov
Films set in Cuba
Films shot in Cuba
Soviet avant-garde and experimental films
Soviet revolutionary propaganda films
1960s Spanish-language films
Mosfilm films
Films about the Cuban Revolution
Films set in Havana
Films shot in Havana
1960s English-language films